Thierry Lodé (born 1956 in Tarbes) is a French biologist and professor of evolutionary ecology in a CNRS lab at the University of Rennes 1.

His work deals mainly with sexual conflict.

Selected works
 Thierry Lodé Darwin et après ? Manifeste pour une écologie évolutive 2014 Eds Odile Jacobs, Paris
 Thierry Lodé La biodiversité amoureuse, sexe et évolution 2011 Eds Odile Jacob 
 Thierry Lodé La guerre des sexes chez les animaux, une histoire naturelle de la sexualité 2006 Eds Odile Jacob 
 Thierry Lodé Les stratégies de reproduction des animaux 2001 Éditions Dunod Masson Sciences
 Thierry Lodé Génétique des populations 1998 Editions Ellipses
 Thierry Lodé 2011 Sex is not a good solution for reproduction: the libertine bubble theory. Bioessay 33: 419–432
 Thierry Lodé et al. 2004 Sex-biased predation by polecats influences the mating system of frogs. Proc Roy Soc 271 (S6):S399-S401
 Bifolchi A & Lodé Thierry 2005 Efficiency of conservation shortcuts: a long term investigation with otters as umbrella species. Biological Conservation 126: 523–527
 Thierry Lodé 2001. Genetic divergence without spatial isolation in polecat Mustela putorius populations. Journal of Evolutionary Biology.14 : 228–236

References

External links
 CNRS  Three questions to Thierry Lodé
 The libertine bubble theory
 Animal ecology and polecat project
 EnDehors Texts by Thierry Lodé 
 A paper in the famous French Hebdo Marianne
 Le Monde libertaire
 Las siete virtudes del amor libre

1956 births
Living people
People from Tarbes
Conservation biologists
Critics of creationism
French anarchists
French biologists
French ecologists
Evolutionary biologists